The Turbo File devices from ASCII Corporation are external storage devices for saving game positions on various Nintendo consoles. They have been sold only in Japan, and are mainly supported by ASCII's own games.

Turbofile 
For the Famicom, released in 1986. It contains 8kB battery-backed SRAM. It connects to the Famicom's 15-pin controller expansion port.

Supported by:
Best Play Pro Yakyuu (1988) ASCII (J)
Best Play Pro Yakyuu '90 (1990) (J)
Best Play Pro Yakyuu II (1990) (J)
Best Play Pro Yakyuu Special (1992) (J)
Castle Excellent (1986) ASCII (J) (early access method without filename) (also supports the Famicom Data Recorder)
Derby Stallion - Zenkoku Ban (1992) Sonobe Hiroyuki/ASCII (J)
Downtown - Nekketsu Monogatari (1989) Technos Japan Corp (J)
Dungeon Kid (1990) Quest/Pixel (J)
Fleet Commander (1988) ASCII (J)
Haja no Fuuin (1986) ASCII/KGD (J)
Itadaki Street - Watashi no Mise ni Yottette (1990) ASCII (J)
Ninja Rahoi! (J)
Wizardry - Legacy of Llylgamyn (19XX) (J)
Wizardry - Proving Grounds of the Mad Overlord (1987) (J)
Wizardry - The Knight of Diamonds (1991) (J)

Turbo File II 
The Turbo File II was designed for the Famicom. Same as Turbo File, but contains 32 Kbytes battery-backed SRAM, divided into 4 slots of 8 Kbytes, the slots are selectable via a 4-position switch.

Turbo File Adapter 
For the Super Famicom, released around 1992. Allows to connect a Turbo File or Turbo File II to Super Famicom consoles. Aside from the pin-conversion (15pin Famicom to 7pin Super Famicom controller port), the device does also contain some electronics (adding a SNES-controller ID code, and inventing a more complicated transmission protocol for entering the data transfer mode).

Supported by:
Ardy Lightfoot (1993)
Derby Stallion II (1994)
Derby Stallion III (1995) (supports both TFII and STF modes)
Derby Stallion 96 (1996) (supports both TFII and STF modes, plus Satellaview mini FLASH cartridges)
Derby Stallion 98 (NP) (1998) (supports both TFII and STF modes)
Down the World: Mervil's Ambition (1994)
Kakinoki Shogi (1995)
Tactics Ogre: Let Us Cling Together (1995) (supports both TFII and STF modes)
Wizardry V: Heart of the Maelstrom (1992) (Japanese version only - the Turbo File hardware detection is made non-functional in the US-version).

Turbo File Twin 
For the Super Famicom, released around 1995. It contains 160 Kbytes battery-backed SRAM. 4×8 Kbytes are used in the four TFII-modes (emulating a Turbo File II with Turbo File Adapter), the remaining 128 Kbytes are used for a new SNES-specific "STF" mode. The STF mode is supported by:
Bahamut Lagoon (1996) Square
Daisenryaku Expert WWII: War in Europe (1996) SystemSoftAlpha/ASCII Corp (JP)
Dark Law: Meaning of Death (1997) ASCII (JP)
Derby Stallion III (1995) (supports both TFII and STF modes)
Derby Stallion 96 (1996) (supports both TFII and STF modes, plus Satellaview mini FLASH cartridges)
Derby Stallion 98 (NP) (1998) (supports both TFII and STF modes)
Gunple: Gunman's Proof (1997) ASCII/Lenar (JP)
Mini Yonku/4WD Shining Scorpion - Let's & Go!! (1996) KID/ASCII Corp (JP)
Ongaku Tsukūru: Kanadeeru (supports STF mode, plus Satellaview flash cartridges)
RPG Tsukūru: Super Dante
RPG Tsukūru 2 (supports STF mode, plus Satellaview mini FLASH cartridges)
Sound Novel Tsukūru (supports STF mode, plus Satellaview mini FLASH cartridges)
Tactics Ogre: Let Us Cling Together (1995) (supports both TFII and STF modes)
Wizardry VI: Bane of the Cosmic Forge (1995) (JP) (English)

Turbo File GB 
For the Game Boy. It connects via the link cable port. Data was stored on memory cards that connected to the device.

Supported titles include:
RPG Maker GB
RPG Maker GB 2

Turbo File Advance 
For the Game Boy Advance. Sold by Sammy.

Supported titles include:
RPG Tsukuru Advance (max 15 saves)
Derby Stallion Advance

References

Solid-state computer storage media
ASCII Media Works